This is a list of locomotives and multiple units that have been used in Finland. VR Group (privatised in 1995, previously Valtionrautatiet, Finnish state railways) had a monopoly on passenger traffic until 1.1.2021, but is currently the only passenger operator on the Finnish rail network.

Electric locomotives

Diesel locomotives

Petrol-Paraffin locomotives

Petrol-Paraffin locomotive references
Data from:
 Finnish Railway Museum official website

Steam locomotives

Steam locomotive references
Data from:
 Finnish Railway Museum official website
 Finnish website with locomotive technical data

Electric multiple units

Diesel multiple units

See also
 Finnish Railway Museum
 Hanko–Hyvinkää railway
 History of rail transport in Finland
 Jokioinen Museum Railway

Literature

References

External links

Finnish Railway Museum Official website
Steam Locomotives in Finland Including the Finnish Railway Museum
Photographs of Finnish Steam Locomotives
Finnish website with locomotive technical data
Detailed drawings of a Finnish 4-6-0
Website about the Hanko–Hyvinkää 4-4-0

Railway locomotive-related lists
 
Locomotives